Hall XXL is a multi-purpose arena in Nantes, France.

Events
 2017 World Men's Handball Championship
 2018 European Women's Handball Championship

References

Indoor arenas in France
Handball venues in France
Music venues in France
Sports venues in Nantes
Sports venues completed in 2013
2013 establishments in France
Music venues completed in 2013
21st-century architecture in France